= Langfang Teachers College =

University in Hebei, China

Langfang Teachers College (Chinese: 廊坊师范学院; pinyin: Lángfāng shīfàn xuéyuàn) is a university in Hebei, China, under the provincial government.
